Aryaka is a company that provides wide-area software-defined network ( SD-WAN) connectivity and application delivery. Aryaka is headquartered in San Mateo, California with additional offices located in London, United Kingdom, Bengaluru, India, Beijing, China, and Singapore.

History
Aryaka was founded in 2009 by Ajit Gupta, Rajeev Bharadhwaj and Ashwath Nagaraj. Gupta previously founded Speedera Networks, a content delivery network (CDN) acquired by Akamai Technologies in 2005 for stock valued at $500 million. Bharadhwaj was previously at cloud service provider Ejasent Inc, acquired by Veritas in 2004 for $59 million. Nagaraj was previously at Allegro Systems (acquired by Cisco Systems in 2001 for $185 million) and founder of Assured Access Technologies (acquired by Alcatel in 1999 for $350 million).

Aryaka announced its service in September 2010.

Aryaka raised $50 million from Goldman Sachs Growth Equity Fund. Previously it had raised a smaller $14M Series-E and had earlier received $45 million in Series D funding in a round led by from Third Point Ventures, adding new investor Deutsche Telekom Capital Partners (DTCP), and with participation from existing investors. In March 2016, it received $16 million in Series C funding from existing investors, Nexus Venture Partners. It previously received $10 million in Series C funding from Trinity Ventures, $25 million in series C funding led by Interwest Partners, $15 million in series B funding and $14 million in series A funding from Trinity Ventures, Mohr Davidow Ventures, and Nexus Venture Partners. Aryaka's foundational multi-segment WAN optimization patent was granted as a US patent in July 2013.

Aryaka built a network to offer its managed wide-area network (WAN). It develops its own technology that includes WAN optimization, multi-cloud connectivity including AWS, Azure, Google Cloud, Oracle Cloud, and Alibaba Cloud, and delivers security as-a-service with partners that include Checkpoint, Palo Alto Networks, and Zscaler.

See also 
 Application delivery network
 Cloud computing

References

External links

Networking companies of the United States
American companies established in 2009
Companies based in San Mateo, California
WAN optimization